The Aurealis Awards are presented annually by the Australia-based Chimaera Publications and WASFF to published works to "recognise the achievements of Australian science fiction, fantasy, horror writers". To qualify, a work must have been first published by an Australian citizen or permanent resident between 1 January and 31 December of the corresponding year; the presentation ceremony is held the following year. It has grown from a small function of around 20 people to a two-day event attended by over 200 people.

Since their creation in 1995, awards have been given in various categories of speculative fiction. Categories currently include science fiction, fantasy, horror, speculative young adult fiction—with separate awards for novels and short fiction—collections, anthologies, illustrative works or graphic novels, children's books, and an award for excellence in speculative fiction. The awards have attracted the attention of publishers by setting down a benchmark in science fiction and fantasy. The continued sponsorship by publishers such as HarperCollins and Orbit has added weight to the honour of the award.

The results are decided by a panel of judges from a list of submitted nominees; the long-list of nominees is reduced to a short-list of finalists. Ties can occur if the panel decides that both entries show equal merit, however they are encouraged to choose a single winner. The judges are selected from a public application process by the Award's management team.

This article lists all the short-list nominees and winners in the best young-adult novel category, as well as novels that have been highly commended. Four people have won the award twice – Isobelle Carmody, Garth Nix, Scott Westerfeld, and most recently Kathryn Barker. Nix and Westerfeld hold the record for most nominations with nine, and Rory Barnes has the most nominations without winning, having been a losing finalist five times.

Winners and nominees
In the following table, the years correspond to the year of the book's eligibility; the ceremonies are always held the following year. Each year links to the corresponding "year in literature" article. Entries with a blue background have won the award; those with a white background are the nominees on the short-list.

 Winners and joint winners
 Nominees on the shortlist

     

Most nominations (as of the 2022 ceremony celebrating 2021 nominees):

 Garth Nix (9)
 Scott Westerfeld (9)
 Jay Kristoff (8)
 Amie Kaufman (7)
 Isobelle Carmody (4)
 Alison Goodman (4)
 Rory Barnes (3)
 Victor Kelleher (3)
 Juliet Marillier (3)

Double wins (as of the 2022 ceremony celebrating 2021 nominees):

 Kathryn Barker (2)
 Isobelle Carmody (2)
 Garth Nix (2)
 Scott Westerfeld (2)

High commendations
The high commendations are announced alongside the list of finalists for their respected year of eligibility. In the following table, the years correspond to the year of the book's eligibility; the ceremonies are always held the following year. Each year links to the corresponding "year in literature" article.

See also

Ditmar Award, an Australian science fiction award established in 1969

References

External links
Aurealis Awards

Aurealis Awards
Australian children's literary awards
Lists of speculative fiction-related award winners and nominees